Furuset Ishockey is an Oslo-based ice hockey club, and a part of the Furuset IF multi-sports club. They play their home games in Furuset Forum. Their team colours are blue and white.

History
Through different eras Furuset have made their name as one of the greatest hockey clubs in Norway Being one of the founder members of the Norwegian Ice hockey association, they had a head start on many opponents.

In December 2008 the club announced that it was on the verge of bankruptcy and that it had informed all players that they were not longer contractually obliged to remain in the club and that the issuance of wages was in jeopardy.

Furuset won their first of seven Norwegian Championships in 1949 to start off the first golden era in club history. Led on by the legendary Leif Solheim they went on to claim a further three championships during the fifties.

The club was unable to replace the great players as the championship team slowly disintegrated. Furuset was soon overtaken by other Oslo clubs, and in the end fell into the lower leagues.

It was not until the early eighties that Furuset re-emerged as a great. Having gained promotion to the top league in the late seventies a fine group of young players blossomed in the limelight of the first division. None of them greater than Ketil Aurstad. Bjørn Skaare, the first Norwegian to play in the NHL, is also a famous player. He led the team to the Norwegian championship in 1980. The feat was repeated in 1983, with yet another great generation of players under way. Furusets last championship was claimed in 1990 with players such as Petter Salsten, Ole Eskild Dahlstrøm and Steve Allman as the leading lights.

After the successes of the early nineties, culminating with an appearance in the play off finals in 1993 Furuset faced an economical crisis. Most of their top players left for bigger clubs, and relegation once again was on the cards. The club spent most of the late nineties and early 2000s as an elevator club between the two top leagues. In the 2015-16 season, Furuset was relegated to the third tier of Norwegian hockey, 2. divisjon, but was later moved up to the second tier again following the failure of Nes IK to reach league requirements.

Season-by-season results
This is a partial list of the last five seasons completed by Furuset. For the full season-by-season history, see List of Furuset Ishockey seasons.

1 Nes IK failed to renew its professional license to play in the 1. divisjon.

Players

Retired numbers

References

External links
 Official Site

 
Ice hockey teams in Norway